The 2021–22 season was Al-Hazem's 65th year in their existence and the first season back in the top flight of Saudi Arabian football after winning the MS League last season. The club participated in the Pro League and the King Cup.

The season covered the period from 1 July 2021 to 30 June 2022.

Players

Squad information

Out on loan

Transfers and loans

Transfers in

Loans in

Transfers out

Loans out

Pre-season

Competitions

Overview

Goalscorers

Last Updated: 23 June 2022

Assists

Last Updated: 27 May 2022

Clean sheets

Last Updated: 22 January 2022

References

Al-Hazem F.C. seasons
Hazem